Marian Azeb Mereba (born September 19, 1990), known mononymously as Mereba, is an American singer, rapper, songwriter, and record producer.

Early life 
Mereba was born in Montgomery, Alabama on September 19, 1990, and raised in Pennsylvania. She first developed an interest in music at age 4. Starting with singing, Mereba eventually learned to play piano, and then guitar. Mereba's parents moved frequently to accommodate their jobs as university professors. Because of this, she was raised around different people with wide ranges of backgrounds. She began writing songs in elementary school and has said they were "a way to process her feelings of often feeling like an outsider in her environment." Mereba went to high school in Greensboro, North Carolina. She also spent nearly a year living in Ethiopia, her father's home country. Her mother is African-American and was born and raised in Milwaukee, Wisconsin.

Education 
After graduating high school at 17, Mereba continued her education at her parents' insistence, attending Carnegie Mellon University in Pittsburgh, Pennsylvania. She eventually transferred in 2009 to the liberal arts women's college Spelman College in Atlanta, Georgia, seeking to immerse herself in the legacy of the historically black women's college. Mereba graduated from Spelman in 2011 with an English degree and a Music minor.

Career

2013–2017: Room For Living, Radio Flyer, and Spillage Village 
After spending years performing in the indie music scene in Atlanta, Mereba self-released her debut project Room For Living EP, under her full name, on February 14, 2013.

2018–2019: The Jungle Is The Only Way Out 
In 2018, Mereba signed to Interscope Records, releasing the singles "Black Truck" and "Planet U", which would go on to appear on her debut album, The Jungle Is The Only Way Out, released February 27, 2019. The album, often acronymed as TJITOWO, was written and produced by Mereba with co-production by Samuel Hoffman, excluding the 9th Wonder-produced track, "Black Truck."

2021: Glock Peaceful 
On December 13, 2021, Mereba released Glock Peaceful. The newly released song was featured as a soundtrack on season 5 of the show Insecure produced by Issa Rae on HBO Max. This song was produced by herself along with producers Chris McClenny and Biako.

Her song Glock Peaceful carries the same themes of racial violence and intersectionality as her Album the Jungle is the only way out. Glock Peaceful is a foreshadowing of a country free of gun violence and police brutality. Mereba tells the role of a storyteller in the song as she illustrates a sunny day in LA where there are no cops and guns are peaceful. The Glock Peaceful singer who has a wonderful way of acknowledging black trauma while planting hope ends the song by assuring the listener that a neighborhood free of gun violence is one step away."

Influences 
Mereba cites Stevie Wonder as her "fairy Godfather" after meeting him in 2016 and becoming his mentee through the last stretch of finishing of her debut album, The Jungle is the Only Way Out. Wonder specifically encouraged Mereba to continue to produce her own music, comparing her passion for production to his own passion for songwriting early in his career. Both passions were initially discouraged by the people who worked with both Mereba and Wonder. Mereb a performed alongside Wonder at Soho House in Malibu in 2017, where he co-signed and personally introduced her to an intimate audience of listeners.

Discography

Studio albums

Extended plays

Singles

Guest appearances

References 

1990 births
Living people
African-American women singers
American rhythm and blues musicians
Musicians from Montgomery, Alabama
American people of Ethiopian descent
Spelman College alumni
Interscope Records artists
Dreamville Records artists